Ceratophyllus rossittensis is a species of flea in the family Ceratophyllidae. It was described by Dampf in 1913.

References 

Ceratophyllidae
Insects described in 1913